Amadee may refer to:

People
Amadee Wohlschlaeger (1911–2014), American cartoonist known professionally as just "Amadee"
Amadee J. Van Beuren (1880–1938), American film producer
Joseph Amadee Goguen (1941–2006), American computer scientist
F. Amadee Bregy, namesake of the F. Amadee Bregy School

Other uses
AMADEE, several programs of the Austrian Space Forum#AMADEE Program

See also

Amade (name)
Amadea (disambiguation)
 Amadeo (disambiguation)
 Amédée (disambiguation)
 Amedeo (disambiguation)
 Amadeus (disambiguation)